Kantunil Municipality (In the Yucatec Maya Language: “place of yellow or precious stone”) is one of the 106 municipalities in the Mexican state of Yucatán containing  (153.29 km2) of land and located roughly 65 km southeast of the city of Mérida.

History
There are no records indicating the history of pre-Hispanic times for this area. After the conquest the area became part of the encomienda system. The known encomenderos for Kantunil are: Juan de Aguilar (1549)l Francisco López de Cieza (1552), Diego López de Cieza (1607), Pedro de Magaña Pacheco de la Cámara (1632), Pedro de Magaña y Contreras,  José de Arrúe (1648), Alonso Chacón de Aguilar (1664-1688), Ignacio Chacón.

Yucatán declared its independence from the Spanish Crown in 1821 and in 1825, the area was assigned to the Coast region with its headquarters in Izamal Municipality. In 1910, Kantunil and Holcá were the only settlements in the area.

Governance
The municipal president is elected for a three year term. The town council has four aldermen, who serve as Secretary of the Town Hall; and councilors of heritage and patrimony; parks, public gardens and cemeteries; and public lighting.

The Municipal Council administers the business of the municipality. It is responsible for budgeting and expenditures and producing all required reports for all branches of the municipal administration. Annually it determines educational standards for schools.

The Police Commissioners ensure public order and safety. They are tasked with enforcing regulations, distributing materials and administering rulings of general compliance issued by the council.

Communities
The head of the municipality is Kantunil, Yucatán. The other populated areas in the municipality are Guadalupe, Holcá, San Adrián, San Diego, San Dimas, San Felipe, San Pedro, Santa María, and Sualahtún. The significant populations are shown below:

Local festivals
Every year from 31 January to 4 February 4, is held a celebration in of the Virgin of Candelaria.

Tourist attractions
 Church of the Virgin of Candelaria, built in the seventeenth century
 archaeological site at Coloba
 Cenote Chihuan

References

Municipalities of Yucatán